Chrysops dimmocki is a species of deer fly in the family Tabanidae.

Distribution
United States.

References

Tabanidae
Insects described in 1905
Diptera of North America